Antonio Nessi (1834 – 1907) was an Italian engraver, painter, and photographer.

Biography
Nessi was a native and resident of Como. At the National Exhibition of Turin he exhibited various engravings depicting monuments and architecture of Lombardy, including: Como Cathedral; the Palazzo del Comune (City Hall) of Como; Torre di Porta Vittoria in Como; Basilica of Sant'Abbondio; Prepositura di San Fedele; Parish Church of San Carpoforo; Torre del Baradello; Santa Maria del Tiglio, all in Como; Baptistery of Galliano; Baptistery of Varese: Baptistery of Lenno; Cloister of Pioria; Archbishopric of Castiglione Olona; and the Church of San Pietro al Monte at Civate. He was one of the first landscape and vedute photographers in Northern Lombardy.

Gallery of early photographs of Lake Como

References

1834 births
1907 deaths
Italian engravers
19th-century Italian painters
Italian male painters
Italian photographers
People from Como
19th-century Italian male artists